Seličevica (Serbian Cyrillic: Селичевица) is a mountain in central Serbia, near the city of Niš. Its highest peak Velika Tumba has an elevation of 903 meters above sea level.

References

Rhodope mountain range
Mountains of Serbia